Ganemos Castilla–La Mancha (Spanish for Let's Win Castilla–La Mancha, Ganemos CLM) was a political platform formed on 8 November 2014 by members from several left-wing parties, organizations and neighborhood and social platforms with the purpose of forming a left-wing electoral coalition ahead of the 2015 Castilian-Manchegan regional election. The platform invited United Left, Podemos, Equo, For a Fairer World and Animalist Party Against Mistreatment of Animals as well as several other parties into the alliance, but in the end only United Left and The Greens joined it.

Member parties
United Left of Castilla–La Mancha (IUCLM)
The Greens (LV)

Electoral performance

Cortes of Castilla–La Mancha

References

Political parties in Castilla–La Mancha
Political parties established in 2015
Defunct political party alliances in Spain
United Left (Spain)